Doom II RPG is a first-person shooter role-playing video game developed and published by id Software. It is the sequel to Doom RPG. It was released for mobile phones on November 23, 2009, and for iPhones on February 8, 2010. It uses the Wolfenstein RPG engine and was developed by id partners Fountainhead Entertainment via the merger id Mobile.

Reception

References

External links 
 

2009 video games
BlackBerry games
Doom (franchise) games
IOS games
Role-playing video games
Id Software games
Mobile games
Video games developed in the United States
Windows Mobile games
Java platform games
Sprite-based first-person shooters
Horror video games
J2ME games